John Graydon "Jack" Hardy (born October 8, 1959) is an American former professional baseball player.  He was a right-handed pitcher for one season (1989) with the Chicago White Sox of the Major League Baseball (MLB). For his career, he recorded no decisions, with a 6.57 earned run average, and four strikeouts in 12⅓ innings pitched.

External links

1959 births
Living people
American expatriate baseball players in Canada
Baseball players from St. Petersburg, Florida
Birmingham Barons players
Buffalo Bisons (minor league) players
Chicago White Sox players
Edmonton Trappers players
Glens Falls White Sox players
Gulf Coast White Sox players
Hawaii Islanders players
Major League Baseball pitchers
Oklahoma City 89ers players
St. Thomas Bobcats baseball players
Vancouver Canadians players
Plantation High School alumni